Ngati Apa v Attorney-General was a landmark legal decision that sparked the New Zealand foreshore and seabed controversy. The case arose from an application by eight northern South Island iwi for orders declaring the foreshore and seabed of the Marlborough Sounds Maori customary land. After lower court decisions and consequent appeals in the Maori Land Court, the Maori Appellate Court and the High Court; the Court of Appeal unanimously held that the Maori Land Court had jurisdiction to determine whether areas of foreshore and seabed were Maori customary land or not. The court also held that, "The transfer of sovereignty did not affect customary property. They are interests preserved by the common law until extinguished in accordance with the law". The effect of the decision was subsequently overturned by the Foreshore and Seabed Act 2004.

Background
Justice Keith succinctly summarised how the case got before the Court of Appeal,

Judgments
The lowest common denominator of the four judgments is “crystal clear”: property rights cannot be extinguished by a “side wind”."

Elias CJ
Chief Justice Sian Elias addressed four main points in her judgment. 

Firstly, Elias CJ addressed the issue of who at common law owned the foreshore and seabed and held, 

In response to arguments by the Crown that there is a presumption of Crown ownership of the foreshore and seabed, Elias CJ cites a number of examples of nineteenth century legislation and evidence from Chief Justice Fenton acknowledging Maori customary rights below the low water mark.

Secondly, the judgment rejected the argument that the Maori Land Court did not have jurisdiction to determine the status of the foreshore and seabed because this area is not land. Elias Cj notes that,  "Both lake beds and river beds have been the subject of claims to the Maori Land Court without jurisdictional impediment [...]. Much legislation concerned with “land” applies to seabed and foreshore".

Thirdly, Elias CJ dismisses suggestions by the Crown that Maori customary interests have been expropriated by the Harbour Acts, Territorial Seas Acts or Resource Management Act.

Finally, the judgment dealt with the precedent created in In Re the Ninety-Mile Beach [1963] NZLR 461 (CA) that, "any Maori customary property in the foreshore had been extinguished once the contiguous land above high water mark had lost the status of Maori customary land". Elias CJ held, "an approach which precludes investigation of the fact of entitlement according to custom because of an assumption that custom is displaced by a change in sovereignty or because the sea was used as a boundary for individual titles on the shore is wrong in law."

Gault P
The judgment of President Gault is the only dissent from the majority's overruling of In Re the Ninety-Mile Beach. Gault P's argument is that,
 

However Gault P notes that if land investigated by the Native Land Court was described as not bordering the sea, the Maori Land Court would have jurisdiction to rule on the status of the strip between land and sea.

Keith and Anderson JJ
The decision of Keith and Anderson JJ was delivered by Justice Keith. The judgment of Keith and Anderson JJ concurs with that of Elias CJ that at common law pre-existing native title and rights continues to exist despite the conferring of radical title in the Crown. The judgment also notes that under New Zealand property law, "property in sea areas could be held by individuals and would in general be subject to public rights such as rights of navigation". On In Re the Ninety Mile Beach, their judgment also notes that it is wrongly decided; "Whether the foreshore was also investigated and was determined to be the Crown's in the course of a particular process is a matter of fact, not a matter to be assumed." On the Territorial Sea Acts they additionally observe, "legislative measures claimed to extinguish indigenous property and rights must be clear and plain".

Tipping J
Justice Tipping joined with the majority of the court in overturning In Re the Ninety Mile Beach, and with the whole of the court in declaring that there was no barrier stopping the Maori Land Court from investigating Maori customary rights in the foreshore and seabed.   

Tipping J restates the problem with the reasoning in In Re the Ninety Mile Beach,

References

2003 in New Zealand law
Court of Appeal of New Zealand cases
2003 in case law
Treaty of Waitangi